Alsophila aceraria is a species of moth in the family Geometridae. It is found from south-western Europe and France to Germany, Austria, Italy, western Ukraine, the Balkan Peninsula, the southern Crimea, the Caucasus and Transcaucasus.

The wingspan is 24–33 mm. Adults are on wing from mid October to mid December in one generation per year.

The larvae feed on Quercus robur, Quercus petraea, Acer campestre, Fagus, Carpinus and Prunus species. The larvae can be found from April to June. The species overwinters as an egg.

References

External links

Lepiforum.de

Moths described in 1775
Alsophilinae
Moths of Europe
Moths of Asia
Taxa named by Michael Denis
Taxa named by Ignaz Schiffermüller